Winnipegosis is an unincorporated urban community in the Rural Municipality of Mossey River, Manitoba, Canada. It lies at the mouth of the Mossey River on Lake Winnipegosis

The community was once categorized as a village, but this status was relinquished on 1 January 2015 upon its amalgamation with the RM of Mossey River.

History 
The lake name Winnipegosis, which has evolved through different spellings, came from the Cree word meaning 'Little Muddy Water', a diminutive of Winnipeg, which means 'Muddy Water'. Mossey River was spelled "Mossy" prior to 1900.

Demographics 

Commerce
The mouth of Mossey River was the site of the original Fort Dauphin fur trading post, constructed by the son of French explorer Pierre Gaultier de Varennes, sieur de La Vérendrye, in the late 18th century. Various forts of different companies, such as the Hudson's Bay Company (HBC), have stood on this site.

The peak of the community's economic boom occurred during the settler-era fur trade and 20th century timber and fishing industries.
 
Emil Hartman was the inaugural postmaster from 1896–1905. The Dauphin railway that arrived in late 1897 named the station after the lake. In 1898, the post office name changed from Mossy River to Winnipegosis, when it joined other buildings moved to the new townsite. That year, the village possessed 2 hotels, 2 boarding houses, 3 general stores, a butcher, a blacksmith, a 30-man sawmill, and 2 larger fish trading companies (North West Fish Co. and The Armstrong Trading Co, subsidiary of Booth Fisheries Co.). Peter McArthur (Standard Lumber Co.) opened the first sawmill that operated until the planer mill burned down in 1924. The Albion Hotel, closed 1908–1911, was renamed Hotel Winnipegosis. Fire destroyed the Lake View Hotel in 1914.

Telephone connections came in 1912. The 1915 directory listed five subscribers. A Bank of Ottawa branch, which opened in 1919, became a Bank of Nova Scotia after the merger that year. The first ice-cream parlour possessed the first radio in 1921. The Winnipegosis Credit Union, formed in 1953, merged into the Dauphin Plains Credit Union in 1970, and further mergers followed.

Schoolteacher Paul Rudiak (–1975) established the Rudiak Flour Mills in 1935, for which Jack Mason was the miller. The 55,000-bushel-capacity National Grain elevator, erected in 1950, closed in 1981, and was demolished in March 2021.

Education, religion & entertainment
The school district formed in 1899. The following year, year a 120-pupil-capacity school was erected. W.J. Coleman was teacher to the 73 students. Staff increased to two in 1906, three in 1913, and four in 1914. The two-storey brick building, which opened that year, remained in use until 1960. When fire destroyed the former building in 1919, a church provided temporary accommodation, until a new two-classroom building opened in the early 1920s. In 1955, a new four-classroom building opened for the collegiate (senior school). Secondary education came under the control of Duck Mountain School Division #34 in 1958, and the elementary followed in 1967. In 1960, the elementary school was rebuilt on 14 acres west of the village, and the collegiate was rebuilt on the original campus. Additional classroom space and gyms augmented both campuses in the 1970s.

The Dauphin Methodist district added Mossey River to its preaching circuit in 1896. C.T. Currelly, appointed missionary during summer 1899, ministered throughout Valley River, Fork River, and Mossey River. The Winnipegosis church building opened in 1901. In 1925, the congregation became part of the United Church. Closed in 2012, the property was sold. Anglican missionary Henry Herbert Scrase, based at Fork River, was known to have held church services and Sunday school at the Winnipegosis schoolhouse 1908–1912. A surplus schoolhouse, moved from Fork River in 1927, became the new church building. Closed in 1967, the property was sold in 1969. Over the years, the rectors of St. Paul's Dauphin, came to administer the sacraments.

Knox Presbyterian opened in 1901, but only a Sunday school outreach 1913–1925, was served by a series of student ministers, a lay minister 1957–1969, and then the ministers for St. James, Dauphin. With a Roman Catholic presence since 1905, the Corpus Christi Church that opened in 1939 replaced a smaller building. The Ukrainian Catholic Church, built in 1929, is a listed historic place.

The Nordheim Mennonite congregation in Winnipegosis began services in 1931, and formally organized in 1933. The initial building served 1934–1964, until replaced to a more central location. The transition from German to English services occurred in the 1960s. A separate Mennonite Brethren congregation existed 1939–1968.

The Jehovah's Witnesses, that functioned c.1946–1987, moved a building from Valley River in 1966. After meeting for years in homes, the Seventh Day Adventist building opened in 1957. Having met in various facilities the previous year, the Ukrainian Orthodox Church moved a building from Dry River in 1961. Soon too small for the congregation, a new building was erected in 1965.

The Rex Hall, opened in 1915, was the venue for concerts, dances, balls, and various events. Sidney Coffey screened movies at a rented hall, before building the Rex. A tea room, confectionary, and balcony were later added. The theatre, seating about 250, closed in 1967.

Healthcare & social services
Dr. A. Ernest Medd (1883–1946) established the first practice in 1909. On marrying Mary Agnes McArthur, they resided the rest of their lives on 2nd St. His patients covered a wide area, and his role as coroner stretched as far as Swan River. Their house has become a museum.

The Sisters of St. Benedict of Winnipeg administered the 20-bed Crerar Hospital 1936–1966 on the grounds of the Corpus Christi Church. The 22-bed Winnipegosis General Hospital opened in 1966, and the 20-bed Personal Care Home in 1980–1981. The Winnipegosis & District Health Centre oversees these facilities.

The Elks Lodge #108 has remained active at least since 1925, before the Manitoba Elks Association formally received its Charter in 1927. The Royal Purple Lodge #86 has operated since 1945. The Marv Elks Memorial Home for seniors opened in the mid-1960s.

The Knights of Columbus #6798 existed from 1975 for about 30 years.

The first ambulance, acquired in 1975, was garaged at the hospital from 1982.

Public services
In April 1915, the lieutenant governor proclaimed the community incorporated as a village. Joseph P. Grenon was the first mayor. Celebrations were held in July 2015 for the 100th anniversary of Winnipegosis.

Outside constables dealt with serious crime prior to the 1915 establishment of a police post. Royal Canadian Mounted Police (RCMP) contracted 1969–1972 and 1982 onward.

The municipal cemetery was created in 1916. At a 1919 commemoration service, returned soldiers placed flowers on the graves of war dead. The next year, the site was staked into plots. The government dock was built in the mid-1920s.

If the 1931 Ramusson store fire had not been contained, the whole town would have been destroyed. A volunteer fire brigade formed in 1933. The fire hall built in 1950 was replaced in 1980.

The open air skating rink established in 1935 was replaced 20 years later. Hockey players and the curling club used several rinks, at various locations, from 1903 onward. In 1937, electric power came and the first street lights were installed.

First St (Main St) was widened and paved in 1961. Water and sewerage pipes were installed in 1965. The village purchased the former train station building in 1977 for a museum, leasing the grounds from CN.

Economy 
Winnipegosis has an economy including restaurants, museums, gas stations, a hotel, financial institutions, grocery stores, hair dressers, a pharmacy, nine-hole golf course and hardware store. The community also has a Royal Canadian Mounted Police detachment, a volunteer fire department, and ambulance service. Today, ranching, agriculture, fishing, tourism and seniors' services provides the community with its present and future economic prosperity.

The area is a popular place for hunting and fishing. American black bear hunting is a growing industry in the Winnipegosis area and with its proximity to Lake Winnipegosis and many small surrounding lakes, it is a haven for migratory game birds and attracts many ducks and geese. There is both commercial and recreational fishing, as there are walleye and an assortment of other Manitoba freshwater fish.

Cell phone coverage was nonexistent until LTE service was installed and established early December, 2019.

Footnotes

References 
 
 

Designated places in Manitoba
Unincorporated communities in Parkland Region, Manitoba
Unincorporated urban communities in Manitoba
Former villages in Manitoba
Hudson's Bay Company trading posts
Populated places disestablished in 2015